The 2004–05 season was the 106th season of competitive league football in the history of English football club Wolverhampton Wanderers. They played the season in the 2nd tier of the English football system, the Football League Championship, after having suffered relegation from the Premier League during the previous campaign.

Season summary
Despite hopes for an immediate return to the top flight, their 2004–05 Championship campaign began dismally, and at one point the side sunk as low as 19th place. Following a 0–1 defeat at Gillingham, a side Wolves had beaten 6–0 just 18 months previous, Jones was sacked at the beginning of November.

Another former England coach was hired the following month, as Glenn Hoddle was appointed on a rolling one-year contract. Under Hoddle, Wolves lost only one of their final 25 league games, but drew 15 to finish ninth in the final table – not enough to qualify for the play-offs.

Results

Pre season
Pre season began on 5 July with training based at the National Sports Centre at Lilleshall, before the squad flew to Tromsø, Norway to begin a three-match tour (16–22 July).

Football League Championship

A total of 24 teams competed in the Championship during the 2004–05 season. Each team would play every other team twice, once at their stadium, and once at the opposition's. Three points were awarded to teams for each win, one point per draw, and none for defeats. The provisional fixture list was released on 24 June 2004, but was subject to change in the event of matches being selected for television coverage or police concerns.

Final table

Results summary

Results by round

FA Cup

League Cup

Players

Statistics

|-
|align="left"|||align="left"|||align="left"|  
|35||0||1||0||2||0||38||0||0||0||
|-
|align="left"|||align="left"|||align="left"| 
|||0||1||0||2||0||||0||5||0||
|-
|align="left"|||align="left"|||align="left"| 
|||1||2||0||1||0||||1||4||0||
|-
|align="left"|||align="left"|||align="left"| 
|||5||2||0||||0||style="background:#98FB98"|||5||5||0||
|-
|align="left"|||align="left"|||align="left"| 
|41||4||2||0||0||0||43||4||5||0||
|-
|align="left"|||align="left"|||align="left"|  
|||1||2||0||2||0||||1||4||0||
|-
|align="left"|||align="left"|||align="left"|  †
|||1||||0||2||0||||1||1||0||
|-
|align="left"|||align="left"|||align="left"|  (c)
|||3||2||0||1||1||||4||8||0||
|-
|align="left"|||align="left"|FW||align="left"| 
|0||0||0||0||0||0||0||0||0||0||
|-
|align="left"|10||align="left"|||align="left"| 
|||3||||0||1||0||||3||3||0||
|-
|align="left"|11||align="left"|||align="left"| 
|||0||2||0||0||0||||0||1||0||
|-
|align="left"|12||align="left"|||align="left"|  
|||0||0||0||1||0||style="background:#98FB98"|||0||2||0||
|-
|align="left"|13||align="left"|||align="left"| 
|||0||1||0||0||0||||0||0||0||
|-
|align="left"|14||align="left"|||align="left"|  ¤
|0||0||0||0||0||0||0||0||0||0||
|-
|align="left"|15||align="left"|||align="left"| 
|||6||0||0||1||0||||6||0||1||
|-
|align="left"|16||align="left"|FW||align="left"| 
|||19||||0||1||1||||20||8||1||
|-
|align="left"|17||align="left"|FW||align="left"|  ¤
|0||0||0||0||0||0||0||0||0||0||
|-
|align="left"|18||align="left"|FW||align="left"|  
|0||0||0||0||0||0||0||0||0||0||
|-
|align="left"|19||align="left"|||align="left"| 
|||4||2||1||1||1||style="background:#98FB98"|||6||3||0||
|-
|align="left"|20||align="left"|||align="left"| 
|||0||1||0||1||0||style="background:#98FB98"|||0||0||0||
|-
|align="left"|21||align="left"|||align="left"|  ¤
|10||0||0||0||0||0||10||0||0||0||
|-
|align="left"|24||align="left"|||align="left"| 
|||0||2||0||2||1||||1||0||0||
|-
|align="left"|25||align="left"|||style="background:#faecc8" align="left"|  ‡
|||1||0||0||0||0||style="background:#98FB98"|||1||0||0||
|-
|align="left"|27||align="left"|FW||align="left"| 
|||15||2||1||1||0||||16||1||0||
|-
|align="left"|28||align="left"|||style="background:#faecc8" align="left"|  ‡ 
|||1||0||0||0||0||style="background:#98FB98"|||1||1||0||
|-
|align="left"|29||align="left"|FW||align="left"|  †
|||1||0||0||0||0||||1||2||0||
|-
|align="left"|30||align="left"|||align="left"|  ¤
|0||0||0||0||0||0||0||0||0||0||
|-
|align="left"|32||align="left"|||align="left"|  ¤
|0||0||0||0||0||0||0||0||0||0||
|-
|align="left"|33||align="left"|FW||align="left"| 
|||7||||0||||1||||8||3||0||
|-
|align="left"|34||align="left"|||align="left"|  ¤
|0||0||0||0||0||0||0||0||0||0||
|-
|align="left"|35||align="left"|FW||align="left"|  ¤
|||0||0||0||0||0||style="background:#98FB98"|||0||0||0||
|-
|align="left"|37||align="left"|||align="left"| 
|0||0||0||0||0||0||0||0||0||0||
|-
|align="left"|40||align="left"|||align="left"| 
|11||0||0||0||||0||style="background:#98FB98"|||0||0||0||
|}

Awards

Transfers

In

Out

Loans in

Loans out

Kit
The season saw a new kit manufacturer as Le Coq Sportif began a two-year merchandising deal. Chaucer Consulting began a five-year run as the club's shirt sponsor. This meant new home and away kits were produced; the away kit was a navy blue shirt with white shorts and socks.

References

Wolverhampton Wanderers F.C. seasons
Wolverhampton Wanderers F.C.